Cannindah is a rural locality in the North Burnett Region, Queensland, Australia. In the  Cannindah had a population of 32 people.

History 
The locality's name is taken from the name of a pastoral run held in 1853 by Hugh Mackay which is shown on an 1872 map of Southern Queensland and again on an 1878 map of the district.

Mount Cannindah State School opened on 1918 and closed on circa 1920.

Cannindah State Schoolopened on 9 November 1932 and closed in 1958.

New Cannindah Provisional School opened in 1926 but closed circa 1933. It reopened circa 1949 but closed 1958.

In the  Cannindah had a population of 32 people.

References 

North Burnett Region
Localities in Queensland